Oscar Alfredo Garré (born 9 December 1956) is an Argentine former professional footballer who played as a defender.

Career
Garré played most of his career (1974–88 and 1989–94) as a defender for Ferro Carril Oeste, and was part of the team that won the Nacional championships of 1982 and 1984. 1982's campaign saw Ferro finish the league without losing a single game.

Garré played for the Argentina national team, he was part of the squad that won the 1986 World Cup.

In 1994, he went to Israel, where he played for Hapoel Kfar Saba and Hapoel Be'er Sheva in the local football league. He retired in 1996, aged almost 40.

After retirement, he has coached such teams as Lanús, Chile's Universidad Católica, and Huachipato. Between August 2006, and 2007 he worked as the coach of his former club Ferro Carril Oeste, he was replaced with former Argentina teammate José Luis Brown.

Personal life
He is the father of the Argentine players Emiliano and Ezequiel. He is also the grandfather of another player, Benjamín

Honours
Ferro Carril Oeste
 Primera División Argentina: Nacional 1982, Nacional 1984

Argentina
 FIFA World Cup: 1986

References

External links

1956 births
Living people
Argentine people of French descent
Argentine footballers
Association football defenders
Argentina international footballers
Argentine Primera División players
Liga Leumit players
Ferro Carril Oeste footballers
Club Atlético Huracán footballers
Hapoel Kfar Saba F.C. players
Hapoel Be'er Sheva F.C. players
1986 FIFA World Cup players
1983 Copa América players
1987 Copa América players
FIFA World Cup-winning players
Argentine football managers
Ferro Carril Oeste managers
Atlético de Rafaela managers
Footballers from Buenos Aires
Club Deportivo Universidad Católica managers
Deportes Concepción (Chile) managers
Huachipato managers
Argentine expatriate footballers
Argentine expatriate football managers
Argentine expatriate sportspeople in Israel
Expatriate footballers in Israel
Argentine expatriate sportspeople in Chile
Expatriate football managers in Chile